Yemenite scrolls of the Law containing the Five Books of Moses (the Torah) represent one of three authoritative scribal traditions for the transmission of the Torah, the other two being the Ashkenazi and Sephardic traditions that slightly differ. While all three traditions purport to follow the Masoretic traditions of Aaron ben Moses ben Asher, slight differences between the three major traditions have developed over the years. Biblical texts proofread by ben Asher survive in two extant codices (the Aleppo Codex and the Leningrad Codex), the latter said to have only been patterned after texts proofread by Ben Asher. The former work, although more precise, was partially lost following its removal from Aleppo in 1947.

The Yemenite Torah scroll is unique in that it contains many of the oddly-formed letters, such as the "overlapping" pe (פ) and the "crooked" lamed (ל), etc., mentioned in Sefer Tagae, as also by Menachem Meiri and by Maimonides, although not found in ben Asher's orthography. The old line arrangements employed by the early Yemenite scribes in their Torah scrolls are nearly the same as prescribed by ben Asher. Like ben Asher's Masoretic tradition, it also contains nearly all the plene and defective scriptum, as well as the large and small letters employed in the writing of the Torah, a work held by medieval scribes in Israel to be the most accurate of all Masoretic traditions.

The disputes between ben Asher and Ben Naphtali are well-known to Hebrew grammarians. Maimonides' verdict in that dispute is in accordance with ben Asher.
The codex that we have relied upon in these matters is the well-known codex in Egypt, comprising twenty-four canonical books, [and] which was in Jerusalem for several years to proof-read the scrolls there from, and all [of Israel] used to rely upon it, since Ben-Asher had proof-read it and scrutinized it for many years, and proof-read it many times, just as they had copied down. Now, upon it, I relied with regard to the book of the Law that I wrote, according to the rules which govern its proper writing.

Maimonides' ruling in this regard eventually caused the Jews of Yemen to abandon their former system of orthography, and during his lifetime most scribes in Yemen had already begun to replace their former system of orthography for that of Ben-Asher. Scribes in Yemen, especially the illustrious Benayah family of scribes of the 15th and 16th centuries, patterned their own codices containing the proper orthography, vocalization and accentuation after Maimonides' accepted practice in his Sefer Torah, who, in turn, had based his Torah-scroll on Ben-Asher's orthography, with especial attention given to the line arrangements of the two Prosaic Songs mentioned by him, the Open and Closed sections of the Torah, and plene and defective scriptum. Such codices were disseminated all throughout Yemen. The tījān (codices) were copied with particular care, since they were intended as model texts from which scribes would copy Torah scrolls, with the one exception that in the Torah scrolls themselves they contained no vocalization and accentuations. In most of these tījān, every three pages equalled one column in the Sefer Torah. A recurring avowal appears in nearly all copies of codices penned by the Benayah family, namely, that the codex which lay before the reader was written "completely according to the arrangement of the book that was in Egypt, which was edited by Ben Asher...." Based on the preceding lines of this avowal, the reference is to the Open and Closed sections that were copied from the section on orthography in the Yemenite MS. of Maimonides’ Mishneh Torah, a work which Maimonides himself claims to have been based on Ben-Asher (i.e. the Aleppo Codex), universally recognized since the time of Maimonides as the most accurate recension of the Hebrew Bible. Benayah’s use of this avowal simply mirrors the words of Maimonides in his Hilkhot Sefer Torah, while most scholars doubt if he had actually seen a codex proofread by Ben-Asher. Others say that the avowal merely refers to the Tiberian masoretic tradition (vowels and accentuations) adopted by the Benayah family in their codices.

Layout
The Yemenite scroll of the Torah is traditionally written on 51 lines to each column, for a total of 226 columns (רכ"ו דפים), a tradition that differs from Ashkenazi and Sephardic scrolls which are historically written in anywhere from 42 to 98 lines (42 lines since the mid-20th century). Unique to Yemenite scrolls, based on what is prescribed in their codices, is that each column concludes with the end of a particular verse and begins with the start of a new verse; never broken in the middle. Each column starts with the opening lines of a new verse, excepting in only six designated places, whose mnemonics are בי"ה שמ"ו (see infra), and excepting in the two prosaic songs (the Song of the Sea and Ha'azinu), where the columns in these places begin in the middle of a verse. These six places (five places when בראשית of Gen. 1:1 is excluded, since it is only used to form the mnemonic) are the only exceptions to the rule, and which practice is intended to ensure uniformity and exactness in the scribal practice and layout in the Sefer Torah throughout all generations. Columns containing the Prosaic Songs are considerably wider to facilitate the writing of the song in its usual format. For the Prosaic Song Ha'azinu, the first column which contains the song is made ca.  in width, while the second column that concludes the song is made ca.  in width. Most are made with full-grain leather (Heb. ğawīl), that is, leather where the "split" layer has not been removed from it. In Yemen, the custom was to treat the raw hide with a tannin-solution made from the leaves of Acacia etbaica (Arabic: qarāḍ) to ensure the leather's lasting durability. This also gave to the leather a reddish-brown luster. The sheets of parchment were traditionally sewn together with sinews (tendons) taken from the animal's loins (flanks), rather than from the animal's heels (the latter being prescribed by Maimonides).

Plene and defective scriptum
There are thirteen orthographic traditions in the first category which are peculiar to the Yemenite tradition and which differ from the traditions borne by other groups. The Yemenite arrangement has been published in many sources, the most notable of which being that of the last Chief Rabbi of Yemen, Rabbi Amram Qorah. By a comparative study, the Yemenite tradition in plene and defective scriptum is nearly in complete harmony with that of the Aleppo Codex which was proofread by the masorete, Ben-Asher.

The prevailing view is that if there is found a Torah scroll that has not been written as prescribed in all of the above (as bequeathed by the ancients) then that same scroll is invalid (lowered in sanctity) and is considered as merely one of the codices (Heb. ḥūmashin).

Irregular letters
Rabbi Yitzhak Razhabi has noted that in the Yemenite Jewish tradition there are over 400 peculiar types of letters (special forms of certain characters) in the Torah and which have been largely adhered to by Yemenite scribes. While these irregular letters do not invalidate a Torah scroll if they had been neglected, the scribes in Yemen still strictly adhered to its practice.

The Large Letters 
The Yemenite tradition of writing the Otiyyot Gedolot (Large Letters) in the Torah differs in some respects from other communities, and follows the traditions as they received them from the scribes of old. The following is a list of all the Large Letters found in the Yemenite scroll of the Pentateuch (Five Books of Moses), as published by 17th century Yemenite scribe, Rabbi Yihye Bashiri, in his book, Havatzelet Hasharon:

Unlike the scribal tradition of Ashkenaz and Sepharad which is to make the nun (נ) of נצר חסד לאלפים in Exodus  of large size, in the Yemenite Jewish tradition the nun is of regular size. Rabbi Yihye Bashiri, in his Havatzelet HaSharon, brings down other traditions concerning the writing of large and small letters in the Torah scroll, but which traditions were not practised in Yemen, and therefore ought to be reckoned as his sole opinion (since they are not mentioned by the renowned Yemenite scribe David Benayah, neither are they written in the Hibshoosh Codex, nor mentioned by the last Chief Rabbi of Yemen, Rabbi Amram Qorah, or in the vast majority of Yemenite codices. Rabbi Yihye Bashiri had, apparently, culled these other traditions from the writings of the kabbalists and other rabbinic scholars outside of Yemen, and wished to incorporate them in the Yemenite tradition, but which practices had never taken hold in Yemen.

The Small Letters

Unlike the scribal tradition of Ashkenaz and Sepharad which is to make the mim (מ) of על מוקדה in Leviticus  of small size, in the Yemenite Jewish tradition the mim is of regular size. Likewise, the letter "yod" in the word פינחס (Numbers 25:10) is written in regular size in the Yemenite tradition, unlike the tradition of other communities who make it small.

Oddly-shaped letters
According to Rashi, the final nun (ן) in וימת תרח בחרן (Gen. 11:32) is to be written upside down, although this was never a practice in the Yemenite Jewish tradition. Instead, the final nun here was written in its ordinary fashion. In other places, however, the Yemenites have preserved the practice of making oddly-shaped letters, where the tradition called for doing so. The Yemenite tradition calls for making 154 overlapping pe`s (פ) in their designated places, with the mouth recoiling inwards upon itself (made by a very thin nib of the pen).  

According to Zechariah ha-Rofé, the justification for making these letters altered from their natural shapes and forms, when there is no other rational explanation for doing so, is that God went out-of-his-way to change the natural order of speech, in Gen. 7:2, so as not to utter the words "defiled animals," although it was shorter, but rather used the more protracted words "animals that are not clean," and that Israelites are to emulate him. Perhaps, too, it is alluded by these forms that in this particular biblical reading, one is to exercise extra precaution so as not to utter a disparaging remark.   

The following is an abridged list of some of the common usages in Yemenite Torah scrolls.

Prosaic Song Ha'azinu
Jewish scribes have preserved a carefully guarded tradition regarding the line arrangements of certain verses, namely, which words are to be written at the forefront of a line, and which words are to be written at the end of the same. The line arrangements of Shirat Ha'azinu (Deut. 32:1–43) in the Yemenite Torah scrolls follow closely that of Ben Asher as conveyed by Maimonides' Mishne Torah, and, unlike the Sephardic tradition of writing the song in seventy lines (based on the Shulhan Arukh), the Yemenite tradition is to write the song in only sixty-seven lines.

The column on the sheet of parchment containing the prosaic song Ha'azinu is made wider than other columns, so as to make room for the poem's layout, written in the format of sixty-seven double half-columns, meaning to say, spaces are made between the verses which appear to descend in two columns. The prosaic song itself is preceded by a blank space, above which are six lines that are written in a format fixed by tradition, with the following words at the head of each line: the 1st line starting with ואעידה and ending with ידעתי; the 2nd line starting with אחרי and ending with מן; the 3rd line starting with הדרך and ending with הרעה; the 4th line starting with באחרית and ending with God's divine name, יהוה; the 5th line starting with להכעיסו and ending with כל; and the 6th line starting with קהל and ending with תמם. The original Yemenite practice was to write these six short lines with indentations before and after the text of each line, rather than draw-out the lines unto the margins by stretching certain letters within the text. The scribal practice of indenting these six lines was also the widespread practice used in Turkey, in very old and exquisite Torah scrolls during the time of Rabbi Chaim Benveniste (1603–1673). After these six lines there is a space followed by the Prosaic Song, written in the format of a song. The Yemenite tradition follows the Aleppo Codex's layout of the Prosaic Song, excepting lines 38 and 39, being the only deviation in word sequence, now believed by most scholars to be an anomaly, by way of confusing the double usage of the Hebrew word גם (q.v. Deut. 32:25) and not knowing which word Maimonides actually had in mind when bringing down the condensed layout for the song. A Sephardic codex written between the 11th–12th century (now Vat. ebr. 448) shows a tradition that is identical to that of the Yemenite tradition with respect to the line arrangements in the poetic song Ha'azinu.

Prosaic Song of the Sea
The "Song of the Sea" (Shirat ha-Yam) is traditionally made on lines appearing as half-bricks set over whole bricks. Rabbi Meir ben Todros Halevi (ca. 1170–1244), when trying to ascertain the correct scribal tradition, mentions his having written to Shemuel ibn Tibbon the physician of Marseilles, inquiring about the scroll of the Torah that was with him and which was copied from Maimonides’ scroll of the Torah. Ibn Tibbon replied, sending to him an accurate copy of the arranged lines of the Song of the Sea in Exodus 15:1–19 as found in the scroll that was copied from Maimonides’ Torah scroll. He writes that he found the three words, את מי הים (= "the waters of the sea"), written at the beginning of the last line. Notwithstanding, Rabbi Meir ben Todros admitted to having deviated from this tradition, having decided against its orthography, seeing that in the Song of the Sea all of the previous lines had thus far ended in one word, and it seemed fitting to him that the second to the last line should also end in one word. He therefore changed its order, by his own admittance. The author of Minḥat Shai followed in suit and also changed the original order of the last two lines in the Song of the Sea. The Yemenite Jews still maintain the old tradition in the line arrangements of the Song of the Sea, following Ben Asher's format in the words that are to begin each line, as well as in the words which are to conclude each line. Their fidelity to tradition has been praised by Dr. Penkower, a specialist of Textual Transmission of the Bible and the Masorah at the Department of the Bible in Bar-Ilan University, who wrote: "It's worthy of adding that in the Yemenite manuscripts of the Torah the arrangement of lines in the Prosaic Song of the Sea is exactly like the arrangement found in the Aleppo Codex, including the last two lines and the lines that are before the Song and that are after it."
 
While all communities will write the Song of the Sea (Shirat ha-Yam) on thirty lines, the format which concludes the song has been slightly altered in some communities due to the doubt raised by Rabbi Meir Abulafia ben Todros of Spain. In the old Sephardic codex (now Vat. ebr. 448), written between the 11th–12th century, it shows the arrangement of lines in the Prosaic "Song of the Sea" (Shirat ha-Yam) just as prescribed by Ben-Asher and as found in the Yemenite tradition, before Rabbi Meir b. Todros Halevi's emendation.

However, in the Yemenite tradition, the words are not joined together, but are written as two words, just as the words appear in the Leningrad Codex and in the Damascus Pentateuch. This anomaly may be attributed to the fact that the Yemenite copyists in their transmission of the masorah made use of several ancient works, and perhaps even their own ancient Torah scrolls, just as they did when conveying the plene and defective scripta of the textus receptus (which almost completely agreed with that of masorete, Ben-Asher) – yet, without the aid or assistance of Maimonides who left no indication on how these words should be written, or just as they did also with the irregular letters written in the Torah, although here, too, Maimonides gave no indication about which of these letters should be made differently. While Ben Asher was the arbiter in cases of vocalization in the Aleppo Codex, he was not, admittedly, the scribe who wrote the text, which scribe was rather Shlomo ben Buya'a. Since the Leningrad Codex, a codex also proofread by Ben-Asher, stands at variance here with the Aleppo Codex's entry, one might only speculate if Ben-Asher ever totally agreed with everything written in those codices. Yishai ben Amram ha-Cohen Amadi (late 16th century), a man who had actually seen the Aleppo Codex and noted its rendition of כסיה as one word, continued to write in his own papers the word as being made-up of two words. Moreover, the Treatise Sofrim which brings down a list of words in the Torah that are written as one word, but read as two words (e.g. בגד in Gen. 30:11 which is read as בא גד, and אשדת in Deut. 33:3 which is read as אש דת) does not list כסיה as one of these words.

Mordechai Breuer makes note of the fact that "versions in the Talmud differ in many instances from the versions of the Masoretes (see, for example, Gilyon ha-Shas, the comments of R. Aqiba Eiger on the margin of the Talmud, Shabbat 55b). Accordingly, Talmudic versions are of no relevance here; perhaps they reflect the 'correct' or 'original' text of the Bible, but they are non-Masoretic by definition, and they have nothing to do with the uniform version which was accepted by the Tiberian Masoretes."

Similarly, according to Rashi, the verse ויהי ביום כלות משה (in Numbers 7:1) is written with כלת in defective scriptum. This, however, is not the case in the Masoretic Texts, nor in the Yemenite Jewish tradition, where the word כלות is written in plene scriptum. Elsewhere, according to Rashi, the word פילגשים in (Genesis 25:6) is also written in defective scriptum, and which is not the case in either the Masoretic texts or in the Yemenite Jewish tradition.

Other line arrangements
A famous rabbinic dictum states that scribes are to be careful to have certain columns begin with fixed words, known by their mnemonics, בי"ה שמ"ו (an allusion to Psalm 68:5). These, too, can be found in their designated places, each letter commencing the word of that column. Such was also the practice in Yemen. For example: The Hebrew character bet (ב) represents the first word in the Torah, בראשית (Gen. 1:1); the Hebrew character yod (י) represents יהודה אתה יודוך (Gen. 49:8); the Hebrew character he (ה) represents הבאים אחריהם בים (Exo. 14:28); the Hebrew character shin (ש) represents שמר ושמעת (Deut. 12:28); the Hebrew character mim (מ) represents מוצא שפתיך תשמר (Deut. 23:24); and, finally, the Hebrew character waw (ו) represents ואעידה בם (Deut. 31:28). Different traditions abound for other communities who traditionally make use of a 42-line column. In the Yemenite tradition, the six-letters of the mnemonic device account for only two verses in the entire Torah where the column begins in the middle of a verse (Exo. 14:28 and Deut. 31:28), whereas in all other columns, the start of a new verse always commences a new column. Likewise, in Parashat Shemini (Leviticus 10:16), a tradition passed down by the scribes was to ensure that each scribe when copying from a master text is careful to write the first דרש (derosh) at the very end of the line, while the second דרש (derash) be written at the forefront of the next line. In the Yemenite Torah scroll brought out from Yemen, now belonging to Azriel ben Saadia Tzadok (Saleh) of Benei Barak, from which a Tikkun Soferim was made in five small pocket volumes to facilitate the accurate transmission of the same masorah by scribes, the first word דרש is, indeed, found at the very end of line no. 14, whereas the second word דרש is found written at the forefront of line no. 15.

There are yet other places in the Torah scroll where Masoretic scribes used key words to determine the layout of each column, and where these same words were traditionally written in specific places in their respective columns, such as in Numbers 31:5 (Hebrew: וימסרו מאלפי ישראל), and where the lamed of ישראל is written at the end of one line, above the ʾalef of צבא at the end of the following line, said to suggest that, from that time forward, Israel was placed above all other nations.

Places in the Yemenite scrolls which differ from the Aleppo Codex
Maimonides, summarizing the different orthographic traditions, wrote: "Authorities on the Masora... differ according to the variations in the scrolls on which they rely." The oldest manuscripts containing the Masora of the early masoretes, such as the London Codex (British Library Or. 4445) and the Leningrad Codex, the Damascus Crown and the Aleppo Codex (based on various testimonies), were all written with a Closed section in pericope Ki Tisa (Exo. 34:1), in the verse פסל לך, while in pericope Ṣav (Lev. 7:28–29) there was written an Open section in the verse המקריב. Neither one of these sections reflect the custom of Yemen today, which points to the assumption that, apparently, they changed their ancient practice in this matter to conform with that of Maimonides, as stated by the late chief Yemenite Rabbi, Yosef Qafih. Scholars have pointed out eight differences between the Aleppo Codex and the Yemenite tradition of orthography. At least in one reference it is believed to be an error by the copyist of the Aleppo Codex, and is not generally practised by any community in Israel, namely, that of writing היא in Leviticus 25:10–12 (יובל היא) with a yod (י) instead of a waw (ו). It is not immediately clear if the Yemenites retained portions of their old tradition when incorporating in their writings the masorah of Ben-Asher.

In the days of Abraham ben Moses ben Maimon (1186–1237), the Jews of Yemen addressed thirteen questions unto him, one of which concerning the interstices --- the Open and Closed sections of the Torah as prescribed by his father, Maimonides, and what to do with a tradition that differs, to which he replied: "We see that there are many differences between the scribes in the matter of the Open and Closed sections, while the books that are in Israel greatly differ in this matter, and we have already seen the exponents of our laws, of blessed memory, who have taken positions in each of these works, which thing has its rightful place, since we do not possess the Book of the Temple court, which [if we had] we could meticulously learn from it about the matter, nor is there regarding this matter a tradition whereupon everyone agrees, to the extent that we could actually disqualify whatsoever contradicts it.  Nevertheless, the right thing is to scrupulously attend to the matter, just as it appears in the Composition (i.e. Mishne Torah), in the Book of Ahavah, but whatsoever is found to be different from it, no one is to give judgment concerning it that it is invalid, unless it is different from all the books that are in existence." The essence of the question implies that the Yemenites formerly had a different practice than that mentioned by Maimonides. The modern Yemenite Jewish custom with respect to the Open and Closed sections of the Torah follows that of Maimonides, in spite of the Shulhan Arukhs ruling (275:2) that scribes ought to strive to fulfill the opinions of, both, Maimonides and Rabbeinu Asher, where they are in agreement, and to avoid making the sections where the sections are only in accordance with one opinion. The Sephardic custom at the time of the author of the Shulhan Arukh was strictly in accordance with Maimonides' prescription, although it, too, has now changed to comply with the Shulhan Arukh.

Yitzhak Ratzaby notes in his Tajā de-Oraitha (p. 14) that, in the old codices made in Yemen before the advent of Maimonides, scribes in Yemen adhered to a different orthographic practice with respect to certain plene and defective scripta and the Open and Closed sections. The Old Yemenite tradition was also to write  (Num. 16:35) in defective scriptum; the word  written without a yod, as described by Nathanel ben Yisha'yah (1983:439), but unlike today's tradition. Other orthographic traditions were known to exist prior to the general reception of the Masoretic text.

Treating of leather and ink used in Torah scroll
In Yemen, large goats (2 yrs. old) were used in making the parchment for Torah scrolls, as opposed to tefillin (phylacteries) in which only small kids of the goats (appx. 2 months old) were used for the vellum. The advantage of goat skin over sheep skin is that goat skin is tougher and finer in grain. In Torah scrolls, the principal tannin substance was derived from the leaves of the salam-tree (Acacia etbaica; A. nilotica kraussiana), a tree known locally by the name qaraḍ (garadh). The same tannin substance and its use in treating leather for sacred scrolls is mentioned by Maimonides (1989:298). These leaves, being astringent, have the same function as gall. A bath solution of the crushed leaves of this tree, into which raw leather had been inserted for prolonged soaking, would take only 15 days for curing. The water and leaves, however, required changing after seven or eight days, and the leather needed to be turned over daily. Usually such treatment would suffice, without the need of spreading any other salve onto the leather, but only in cases where there was an erasure and the newly applied ink would spread would scribes in Yemen practise "sizing" of the leather, a process so-called by treating the leather parchment with a paste of Tragacanth gum or Gum arabic, and allowing the place to dry before applying ink. In some places, the fleshy-side of the leather (being the side that is written upon) was treated with a fine application of castor oil, taken directly from the bean of the castor oil plant (Ricinus communis), and which application is known to give added elasticity and durability to the leather.

According to Amram Qorah, the way in which leather was prepared in Yemen for use in writing a Torah scroll was as follows: 
If it were full-grain leather (Heb. ğawīl) that the scribe wanted to write a Torah scroll upon, he would go to the tanner, select for himself sheep hides that had been treated (cured) to his satisfaction, and the tanner would sell them to him in their imperfect state, without trimming and without modification. The scribe then brings them to his house, softens them by sprinkling water upon them, and then spreads them out and stretches them, and then smooths the face of the leather on its flesh side, by scraping it with an instrument called a rasp (Arabic: mibshara). Afterwards, he cuts away the excessive edges and the outer corners, until he is left with a square sheet of leather. He then stains the sheet [of leather] with a dye solution made of turmeric, which resembles the colour of saffron, and then marks on the two ends of the sheet of parchment with the aid of a tool called a ruler the number of lines that are customarily made, and thus he delineates lines after he had rubbed the face of the leather on the side facing the hairs, with a smooth stone, in a scrupulous manner, so that it will be fitting and make writing easier. He then divides the columns and, forthwith, begins his task [of writing].
[As for the parchment known as q'laf] (the leather that is not whole, and used mainly for writing the portions contained in the Tefillin), most scribes were skilled in treating leather for use as q'laf. The scribe does all those steps mentioned in the working of ğawīl, and smooths the face of the leather on its flesh side, for the space of what is needed to write upon [and no more], leaving it white, without dyeing it any colour."

In Yemen, scribes prepared their own ink concoction, usually made from soaking copper sulphate crystals (copper vitriol) in water, known locally as zāğ, but more often by mixing in the water al-ḥura (Litharge of alum), qishr rumān (Pomegranate rinds), ʿafaṣ (Gall), ground to a powder and steeped in water and exposed to the sun's rays for two or three days, sifted of its residue and its yellowish liquid added to the ink concoction only near the time of writing, and after the ink had once again been allowed to sit in the sun for more than a day in order to receive its luster. An excessive amount of gall was seen as detrimental to the ink, therefore, used sparingly, as also too many pomegranate rinds will cause the ink to fade. A little sugar was also added to the ink concoction, as well as soot from the flame of burnt oils held against glass and ṣameġ (Gum Arabic). In some places, wormwood (Artemisia absinthium), or what is called in Arabic shiba, was added to the ink to preserve the leather from mold and mildew. The traditional writing instrument in Yemen was the cane reed (calamus), rather than the feathered quill.

Forms of the letters and special techniques
Just as there is a unique style of writing associated with Ashkenazi scrolls, and another style for Sephardic scrolls, so too is there a style of writing that is peculiar to Yemenite scribes of the previous centuries. Each community, however, makes use of the square Hebrew script. In the older Torah scrolls of Yemenite provenance, there was not a practice among scribes to write the Hebrew letters with their Tagim, since the accurate tradition of doing so had long been lost. The ancient practice in Yemen when writing the letter ḥet (ח) is to make its roof flat, and not a "gable-roof," as prescribed by Rabbeinu Tam (Yaakov Meir), although more modern scrolls have adopted Rabbeinu Tam's method. The difference stems from one's understanding of the word חטרי in Tractate Menaḥoth. In Yemenite scrolls, the Hebrew letters are made to suspend a fraction below the ruled lines, rather than hang directly from the ruled lines.

The manner in which Jewish scribes made certain Hebrew characters has evolved throughout the years in Yemen. Rabbi David ben Zimra (1479–1573) mentions the practice of the Jews of Aden, where in all their Torah scrolls the left leg of the Hebrew character he (ה) was slightly joined to the roof of the letter, a practice which he disqualifies, although admitting that such was also the practice that he found in old scrolls written in Egypt, and which practice had been rendered valid by Rabbi Isaac ben Sheshet and Rabbi Joseph Colon. Nevertheless, the old practice in Yemen of slightly joining the leg of the Hebrew character he (ה) to its roof, or the leg of the qof (ק) to its roof, eventually evolved to conform with the custom that is practised in other communities in Israel. Rabbi Yosef Qafih, commenting on Maimonides' Mishne Torah, responds to the old practice and goes to great lengths to show that such letters, had they been written in such a way, should not be disqualified, although the custom in Israel has now changed.

One of the unique features found in scrolls penned in Yemen is the practice of marking the end of the biblical verse, not with ink, but by stamping the leather with a round-tipped metal instrument at the end of the verse, in order to assist the baal qoré when reading and knowing when he is to come to a full-stop. These dot-like impressions in the leather were made so as to resemble an inverted segol (one dot on top of two dots). Where the reading was to produce the sound made by the trope symbol etnaḥa (brief pause), it too was marked with only one dot by the same instrument beneath the word whose reading is to be read as such. Two diagonal stamp marks were made above the word whose reading called for it to be read with a zarqa. Some have questioned the validity of marking a Torah scroll in this way, but the sages of Yemen have explained its validity by saying that extraneous markings that are made in the leather without ink are permitted.Cf. Shulchan Aruch (Yoreh De'ah §274:7 [6]): "A book [of the Law] that is punctuated is invalid, and even if they had removed from it the punctuation symbols; so, too, a division of verses [in the Torah] is invalid." Addenda (Moses Isserles): "And this refers, specifically, to when he made the biblical cantillation symbol with ink, etc."

Yemenite Torah scrolls traditionally had also the additional feature where the top corners of each leather sheet of parchment were folded backwards, immediately following the leather's treatment and before the actual writing. This was done to distinguish between each sheet, as also to give the reader the ability to grasp with his two hands the sheet of parchment by the folds, without touching the letters themselves. The left and right margins of each sheet of parchment were made to a standard width of one-fingerbreadth (ca. 2.5 cm.), and when coupled together with other sheets, the margins came to two fingerbreadths. The stitching of the sheets of parchment together was made differently from the practices found among other groups, in that the stitching made with ligaments was made closer together (appx. one centimeter between stitches) and more tightly fitting in Yemenite scrolls. As required in Jewish law, and as found among all other groups, they did not sew the sheets together at the upper and lower ends of the margins, but left a space there unstitched.

Torah cases
The Torah case (Heb. tiq) traditionally used in Yemen was either a seven faceted or octagonal wooden box, typically made of a light wood, such as Sudanese teak (Cordia abyssinica), equipped with a pair of brass clasps cut in ornamental floral shapes for closing. The entire wooden box was fitted tightly with a thickly woven decorative cloth, replete with 3 to 5 buttons with matching loops. The top of the box was made with slits wherein they inserted protruding staves for carrying the decorative silver finials (Heb. rimmonim).

Testimonials
Yaakov Sapir (1822–1886), a Lithuanian Jewish scholar from Jerusalem, was commissioned by the Jerusalem Rabbinate and traveled to Egypt, to Yemen and to India between the years 1857 to 1863. In 1859, he visited the Jewish community in Yemen, publishing an account of his travels soon thereafter in a book entitled, Iben Sapir, perhaps one of the most momentous travelogues ever to have been written in that century, and where he describes the life of the Jewish community there. He also described the Torah scrolls and codices had in Yemen and their peculiar tradition of orthography, an excerpt of which follows.

And lo, in their books of the Torah there are to be found several differences in defective and plene letters, for example: minnaso  (Gen. 4:13), [in the  verse, "My iniquity is greater than I can bear,"] lacks a waw; [or] maʻayanoth (Gen. 7:11) [in the verse, "All of the fountains of the deep were opened,"] lacks a waw; [as well as] wiyiheyu kol yamei noaḥ (Gen. 9:28), [in the verse, "And all of the days of Noah were," etc., is written] with the addition of a waw at its end; teʻaseh (Exo. 25:31), [in the verse, "Of beaten work shall the candlestick be made,"]  lacks a yod; ḥodsheikhem (Num.10:10), [in the verse, "Your new moons," etc., is written] with the addition of a yod; as also in the lay-out of the Song of the Sea (Exo.15: 1-ff.) and in certain closed sections [of the Law]. And I saw that all their ancient books were [written] in this way.

(A note appended later by R. Yaakov Sapir to the above section reads as follows:)

I do recall my faults this day. When I had taken with me a scroll of the Torah [written] in the handwriting of the scriveners of Yemen, and when I had proofread it, I found in it the differences that I formerly mentioned, as well as other [changes] – besides that which can be attributed to scribal error, and I corrected it after the manner of our own books. Then when I happened to be, afterwards, in Paris during [the month of] Tishri, 5625 anno mundi (1865 CE), I saw a book in the library of that great personage, the savant and honorable teacher and Rabbi, Rabbi Hertz Ginsburg (may his light shine), which [library] stood under the supervision of my beloved friend, the wise and illustrious Rabbi, [even] our teacher the Rabbi, S. Zacks (may his light shine), a most dear manuscript made by the Rabbi [who is known as] the Meiri, of blessed memory, [and which book was entitled], Kiryat Sefer.
 
Its name is derived from [its content, which treats on] all the laws governing the scroll of the Law, how it ought to be written, and how read, therein showing all of the defective [letters], and plene [letters], open sections and closed sections, [etc., which scribes are wont to make in a scroll of the Law] – nothing being left undone, whether small or great, which he did not bring out in that book. He has withal done far more than what could ever have been expected, whether it were of any man who came before him, or who should come after him.
Now I shall copy here, in short, an outline of the matters from one of the chapters, being useful for the purport [of our discourse], and whose words are as follows:

"Now behold, herein, do I make a copy of the writing which the forenamed Rabbi (i.e. the Ramah, of blessed memory) sent to the sages of Burgos [in Spain] who had belabored themselves on this point (i.e. over the subject of proofreading the scroll of the Law) with a well-known book [of the Law] attributed to Hillel the elder, [and] which was called by them Halleujah."
  
The [author of the book] Yuchasin wrote these words: "Now in the year 4956 anno mundi (1196 CE), on the 8th of Menaḥem Av, there fell out a great religious persecution in the kingdom of León, to the extent that they carried away from there a Codex containing the 24 canonical books of the Bible, called the Biblia, which R. Hillel had written, and from which they would proofread the texts of all the scrolls. Now I saw some of them (i.e. scrolls) that were sold in Africa, and at my time, they were nine-hundred years old since the time they were first written." The [same author of the book] Yuchasin, on the year 5250 anno mundi (1490 CE), wrote: ha-Qimḥi (c. 1160–c. 1235) said in his Piece on Grammar, in the chapter lemaʻan tizkaru, that the Codex was in Toledo [of Spain], and [that it was found written after its prescription] in the books [of the Law] left by the early Geonim, [particularly] by Rav Sherira [Gaon] and Rabbeinu Hai [Gaon]. And when the books of Rabbeinu Moshe (i.e. Maimonides, of blessed memory) came amongst them and they saw his tradition of orthography in this regard, they sent to him (i.e. to the Ramah) and he answered them after [much] flowery speech and many praises, whose words were these: 'But presently I shall tell you the truth, that all the books that have reached us of those books written by Rabbeinu Moshe (Maimonides), may peace rest on him, with regard to open sections and closed sections, all of them were engrossed with different errors one from the other, since the words of the book were concealed [from understanding], and those copyists who copied from it made rash decisions on their own, and each one added [what he pleased], and diminished [from the true text] according to his own understanding, thus defacing the books with things that they imagined in their heart to be true, and which they gave their opinion to, but which I was compelled to investigate and make inquiry into, etc., etc. And so, I sent to Marseilles, to the most erudite man [there], Samuel Ibn Tibbon, the physician, and I asked him to send me an [accurate] account of the closed and open sections from the book [of the Law] that was copied from the book [of the Law] belonging to that Rabbi (i.e. Maimonides) that came with him to Marseilles, and which said Rabbi (may his memory be blessed) had signed in his own handwriting; as also that which I, myself, had written down from the book (that was no longer before me), I am Moshe, the son of Rabbi Maimon the Sepharadi. And so did he do, sending them to me with due speed, and I found in the copy of the writing, etc. all the things that you brought to my attention for a decision [as touching the writings of Maimonides] that they were [indeed] true, etc. and that the other matters that were concealed [therein from our understanding] were not made clear unto me by that book until I was compelled to once again search and inquire [into them], etc., and it was revealed unto me their import by the help of Him who favors man with understanding. Now, behold! They are written in this [leafed] booklet which is being sent to you, etc., [both] open and closed [sections], [and] that which is neither an open [section] nor a closed [section], but rather an arranged [section], in my own handwriting. Likewise, I have written for you the lay-out of the [prosaic] song Ha'azinu in two categories: one, containing the names of words that come at the beginning of each line; the other, containing the names of words that come at the end of each line. (Now there are altogether sixty-seven lines [in the prosaic song Ha'azinu], just as it is found in my handwritten Bible Codex, and in [copies of] Maimonides of [those made by the] early exponents of our laws…) … [Signed]: From him that has been afflicted with reproof of instruction, not with whips, per se, but with scorpions, until he was compelled to confess his sorrow unto many – perchance they will seek mercy upon him from Him who has mercy; [I], who writes to his friends and companions, Meir Halevi, the son of R. Todros.' "

And, there, the Rabbi who is the Meiri, of blessed memory, writes more, [viz.], that in Toledo [of Spain] there was a book [of the Law] called the Book of Ezra, and a certain Codex that was copied from the Codex belonging to the Ramah (i.e. Meir ha-Levi b. Todros Abulafia, c. 1165–1244), whom we mentioned, which [latter] was proofread many times with utmost diligence by several scribes and wise men, in the forenamed city, with painstaking care and great expense, and came afterwards into his hand with all the testimonies of the proofreaders and scribes, and, based on it, he wrote in this, his own book Kiryat Sefer, every word which is either defective or plene, open and closed sections, in the year of the exile of France, which corresponds to the year 5066 anno mundi (1306 CE). Unto here we have brought down his words. Now, behold! I have found [and] seen in this [book], Kiryat Sefer, exactly as it is found written in the scrolls of Yemen! (q.v. supra, the treatise on Egypt, where I have elaborated in great length about all their details.) And so, in vain have I erased and made corrections. Now if I had seen it beforehand, I would not have touched it [with my own] hand! But He is merciful [and] atones for iniquity… ENDOriginal:והנה בס"ת שלהם נמצא כמה שנויים בחסר ויתר כמו מנשא (בראשית ד' י"ג) ח"ו מעינת (נח ז' י"א) ח"ו ויהיו כל ימי נח (נח ט' כ"ח) בואו לאחרונה תעשה (תרומה כ"ה ל"א) ח"י חדשיכם (בהעלותך י' י') מ"י וכן בצורת שירת הים ובאיזה סתומות * וראיתי שכל ספריהם הקודמים כן הוא

(המחבר הוסיף הערה זו בעת הדפוס)

את חטאי אני מזכיר היום כי הבאתי עמי ס"ת מכתיבת סופרי תימן וכאשר הגהתיה מצאתי בה השנויים הנז' ועוד (לבד איזה טעות סופר) ותיקנתיה עפ"י ספרים שלנו. ובהיותי אח"כ תשרי תרכ"ה בפאריז ראיתי בבית עקד הספרים של הגביר האדיר החכם הנכבד מו"ה הירץ גינצבורג נ"י העומדת תחת יד ידי"נ הרב החכם המפואר מוהר"ש זאקש נ"י ספר כ"י יקר להרב המאירי ז"ל קרית ספר. שמו על כל דיני ס"ת כתיבתו וקריאתו ומצויין בו כל החסרות ויתרות ופתוחות וסתומות לא הניח דבר קטון וגדול שלא העלה בספר הזה והוא מפליא לעשות מכל אשר לפניו ולאחריו. ואעתיק בזה בקיצור ריש מילין מפרק אחד הנצרך לענינינו וז"ל: "והריני כותב כאן כתב שלחו הרב הנזכר (הרמ"ה ז"ל) לחכמי בורגיש שטרחו על זה (בהגהת ס"ת) עם ספר הידוע להלל הזקן שנקרא ביניהם הללויה. [היוחסין כ' וז"ל: "ובשנה ד"א תתקנ"ו בח' למנחם הי' שמד גדול במלכות ליאון ואז הוציאו משם ספר הארבע ועשרים נקרא הביבליא שכתב אותם ר' הלל ומשם היו מגיהים כל הספרים ואני ראיתי חלק מהם שנמכרו באפריקא ובזמני הי' תשעה מאות שנה שנכתבו. (והיוחסין ה"א ר"נ) והקמחי אמר בחלק הדקדוק בפ' למען תזכרו שהחומש היה בטוליטולא.] ובספרים ישנים לגאונים הראשונים של רב שרירא ורבינו האיי וכשבאו ספרי רבינו משה (הרמב"ם ז"ל) אצלם וראו סדריו בענין זה שלחו לו (להרמ"ה) והשיב להם אחרי המליצית והשבחים כו' כו' וז"ל: "ועתה אמת אגיד לכם כי כל הספרים אשר הגיעו לידינו מספרי רבינו משה ע"ה בענין הפתוחות והסתומות כולם היו מוטעים טעיות משונות זה מזה מפני דברי הספר שהיו מסותמים והמעתיקים ממנו באו להכריע מדעתם והוסיף כל אחד וגרע כפי הכרע דעתו והשחיתו את הספרים בדברים אשר בדו מלבם ואשר הכריעו מדעתם ואני הוצרכתי לחקור ולדרוש כו' וכו' ושלחתי למארסילי' לחכם המובהק שמואל אבן תיבון הרופא ובקשתי ממנו לשלוח לי נוסח הפרשיות הסתומות והפתוחות מן הספר המועתק מספר הרב שבא עמו למארשילי' ושהרב זכרונו לברכה חתם עליו בחתימת ידו וגם זה מן הספר שכתבתי אני שלא בפני אני משה בר' מיימון הספרדי וכן עשה ושלחם אלי בזריזות ומצאתי בפתשגן הכתב כו' את כל הדברים אשר הכרעת דעתי כי אמת הי' כו' ושארי הדברים המסותמים לא נתבררו לי מן הספר ההוא עד אשר הוצרכתי לשוב ולחקור ולדרוש כו' ונתגלו לי שאריתם בעזרת החונן לאדם דעת והנם כתובים בקונטירס הזה השלוח אליכם כו' פתוחות וסתומות לא פתוחה ולא סתומה אלא סדורה כ"י וכן כתבתי לכם צורת שירת האזינו בשני סימנים אחד בשמות התיבות שבראש כל שטה ואחד בשמות התיבות שבראש כל שטה האחרון [א"ס והם בששים ושבע שיטין כמו בהתנ"ך כ"י שלי וברמב"ם כ"י הראשונים והארכתי בזה במ"א.] ... מאת המיוסר בתוכחת מוסר לא בשוטים כי אם בעקרבים עד שהוצרך להודיע צערו לרבים אולי יבקשו עליו רחמים מאת בעל הרחמים כותב לידידיו ורעיו מאיר הלוי בר' טודרוס

וכותב עוד שם הרב המאירי ז"ל שבטולטילא הי' ספר נקרא ספר עזרא וספר אחד שנעתק מספר הרמ"ה הנז' והוגה פעמים רבות בחריצות נפלא ע"י כמה סופרים וחכמים בעיר הנז' בטרחה והוצאה מרובה והגיע אח"כ לידו עם כל העדיות של המגיהים והסופרים ועל פיו כתב בספרו זה קרית ספר כל מלה חסרה ויתרה פתוחות וסתומות בשנת גלות צרפת היא שנת חמשת אלפים וששים ושש לבריאת העולם עכ"ל. והנה מצאתי ראיתי בזה הקרית ספר כפי הכתוב בספרי תימן (ראה למעלה במצרים שהארכתי בכל פרטיהם.) ובחנם מחקתי ותקנתי ואם ראיתיו קודם לא נגעתי בה יד והוא רחום יכפר עוןNotes:'''

See also
 List of Hebrew Bible manuscripts

References

Bibliography

 

 (Hebrew title:כתבי היד התימניים של התורה והמסורת המשתקפת מהם בהשוואה למסורת הכתיב הניקוד והטעמים שבכתר בן-אשר ול"חלק הדקדוק" של מהרי"ץ)

, s.v. Part II, responsum # 596 (reprinted in Israel, n.d.)

 
 (reprinted in Jerusalem 1969 by Makor Ltd.)

 (in five pocket volumes)

Further reading
 Amar, Zohar, "ʿIbūd ʿOr Ǧirafah le-Ketivat S'TaM" (The Treatment of Giraffe Parchment for Writing Torah Scrolls, Tefillin and Mezuzzot), in: Massorah le-Yosef (vol. 9), Kiryat Ono 2016, pp. 135–148
 Nahum, Yehuda Levy: Mi-Yetzirot Sifrutiyyot Mi-Teman (Fragments of Literary Works from Yemen), Holon 1981, pp. 160–166 (Hebrew)
  Rigler, Michael: Benaya the Scribe and His Descendants: a Family of Scribes from Yemen, Journal: Pe'amim 64, (Summer, 1995), pp. 54–67, (Hebrew) and the extensive sources listed there, including a complete list of surviving manuscripts of Benayah and his family.
 Würthwein, Ernst (translated by Erroll F. Rhodes), The Text of the Old Testament: An Introduction to the Biblia Hebraica, Grand Rapids 1995 
 Yeivin, Israel: The Aleppo Codex of the Bible : a study of its vocalization and accentuation'', Jerusalem 1969, pp. 361–362 (Hebrew: כתר ארם צובה : ניקודו וטעמיו)

External links
Israel Hayom: 400-year-old Yemenite Torah scroll to be restored in Jerusalem
The Accuracy of our Written Torah

Early versions of the Bible
Hebrew Bible manuscripts
Hebrew Bible versions and translations
Hebrew calligraphy
Jewish prayer and ritual texts
Jewish manuscripts
Jews and Judaism in Yemen
Torah
Yemenite Jews